The 1950 Texas Longhorns baseball team represented the University of Texas in the 1950 NCAA baseball season. The Longhorns played their home games at Clark Field. The team was coached by Bibb Falk in his 8th season at Texas.

The Longhorns won the College World Series, defeating the Washington State Cougars in the championship game.

Roster

Schedule

Awards and honors 
Bob Brock
 First Team All-American

Charlie Gorin
 First Team All-American
 First Team All-SWC

Kal Segrist
 First Team All-SWC

Ben Tomkins
 First Team All-SWC

Murray Wall
 First Team All-American

Frank Womack
 First Team All-SWC

References 

Texas Longhorns baseball seasons
College World Series seasons
NCAA Division I Baseball Championship seasons
Texas Longhorns
Southwest Conference baseball champion seasons
Texas Longhorns